Nephus sordidus, known generally as the little brown mealybug destroyer or sordid ladybug, is a species of dusky lady beetle in the family Coccinellidae. It is found in North America.

In California's San Joaquin Valley, N. sordidus is an important predator of mealybugs on grapes, pistachios, and almonds, including vine mealybug, grape mealybug, and  Gill's mealybug (Ferrisia gilli).

References

Further reading

 
 
 
 
 
 
 

Coccinellidae
Articles created by Qbugbot
Beetles described in 1895